Eliphaz is one of Esau's sons in the Bible. 

Eliphaz or Eliphas is also the given name of:

 Eliphaz (Job), another person in the Bible
 Eliphaz Dow (1705-1755), the first male executed in New Hampshire, for murder
 Eliphaz Fay (1797–1854), fourth president of Waterville College (now called Colby College)
 Eliphas Levi (1810-1875), French occultist born Alphonse Louis Constant
 Eliphas Shivute (born 1974), Namibian retired footballer

See also
 Elifaz, Israel, a kibbutz
 Eliphas Buffett House, Cold Spring Harbor, New York, on the National Register of Historic Places

Masculine given names